Kevin John Wasserman (born February 4, 1963), better known by his stage name Noodles, is an American musician who serves as the lead guitarist and backing vocalist for The Offspring.

Biography
Kevin John Wasserman was born in Los Angeles, California. Before joining The Offspring, Noodles played in a local band called Clowns of Death. He was allegedly in The Offspring because he was the only person old enough to provide alcohol for the rest of the members. He earned the nickname "Noodles" for his frequent noodling on the guitar. At one of the band's earlier shows, he was stabbed in the shoulder by a skinhead.

During the band's early days, Noodles worked as a janitor at Earl Warren Elementary School in Garden Grove. Before Smash was released, he had been planning to quit the band, but the surprising success of "Come Out and Play" forced him to reconsider.

On their DVD release Huck It (2000), as part of a mock interview, Noodles claims to like the "finer things in life", such as red wine, classical music, cigarettes, poetry and pasta. He occasionally goes snowmobiling and snowboarding.

Equipment

Guitars
Noodles generally plays Ibanez guitars, and he has now had four signature models, each of which is a Talman. His first was the NDM1, which has a duct tape finish. Second was the NDM2, which has The Offspring's logo with glasses on the pickguard. His third
signature guitar, the NDM3, had P90 pickups. His latest signature guitar is the NDM4. It also has P90 pickups and has a sunburst finish on it. He prefers DiMarzio Tone Zone pickups.

In the early days of The Offspring, he played a wider range of guitars, including Fender Telecasters, Ibanez Talmans and Gibson Les Pauls. He also owns other guitar models, such as Paul Reed Smith guitars, a Fender Stratocaster and other Fender models, Jackson guitars, and Gibson guitars. In an interview on The Offspring's Complete Music Video Collection, Noodles said that he gave his Stratocaster to one of the actors that appeared on the video for their 1994 single "Self Esteem".

Amplifiers
For early Offspring albums, Noodles used a Mesa/Boogie Mark IV.  In 2013, he was turned on to VHT amplifiers by the band's guitar tech and has since used Mark IVs and VHTs in unison.

References

External links

1963 births
Living people
American punk rock guitarists
Lead guitarists
The Offspring members
Guitarists from Los Angeles
20th-century American guitarists
Janitors